Bhalobasa Bhalobasa may refer to:

 Bhalobasa Bhalobasa (1985 film), a 1985 film directed by Tarun Majumdar, starring Tapas Paul and Deborshree Roy
 Bhalobasa Bhalobasa (2008 film), a 2008 film directed by Ravi Kinagi, starring Hiran Chatterjee and Shrabanti Chatterjee
 Akash Chhoa Bhalobasa, a 2008 Bangladeshi Bengali-language film

See also